Hollow Church is the archaeological excavation of what used to be a Romanesque Roman Catholic church in 11th century Croatia. Originally named Basillica of Saint Peter and Moses, the building was built on the foundations of an older Christian church next to a 6th-century Byzantine chapel in the vicinity of the ancient ruins of Salona.

The church is notable for being the crowning place of King Zvonimir, and along the lines of buildings like Saint Stephen and Saint Mary in Solin, is one of the remains of churches built by the Croats in the 11th century. It had three apses; 26 meters long and 13 meters in width, each separated by a column. The narthex was positioned on the western entrance, while the southern side obtained a steeple, from which only few steps still remain. The narthex allegedly contained a sarcophagus quite possibly of a Croatian king.

The location was first excavated in modern times in the 1920s. In 1931, the excavation work was done by Ejnar Dyggve, whose work there ended after the death of Frane Bulić in 1934. In 1935, Ljubo Karaman restarted works for a period of time. Some restoration work was undertaken in the 1950s, but the most serious archaeological investigation was done in 1990-1993. The site was secured and mostly excavated, but is still threatened by the waters of Jadro and a nearby road.

See also
 Church of Holy Cross, Nin
 Church of Holy Salvation, Cetina

References

Gallery

Further reading

External links
 Images of Hollow Church
 Hollow Church on Solin's website

Churches in Croatia
11th-century establishments in Croatia
Archaeological sites in Croatia
Medieval architecture
Medieval sites in Croatia